Alive Before the Iceberg is live album by Seattle Alternative rock band The Posies. Recorded live at Luz De Gas (in Barcelona, Spain) on July 28, 1998.

Track listing 
 "Somehow Everything" – 3:49
 "Please Return It" – 3:26
 "Dream All Day" – 2:57
 "You’re the Beautiful One" – 6:11
 "Start a Life" – 5:07
 "Precious Moments" – 3:40
 "Grant Hart" – 2:05
 "Flavor of the Month" – 2:59
 "Everybody Is a Fucking Liar" – 3:13
 "Broken Record" – 3:36
 "Surrender" – 6:25
 "Throwaway" – 3:55

Personnel 
The Posies
 Jon Auer – guitar, vocals
 Ken Stringfellow – guitar, vocals
 Joe Skyward – bass
 Brian Young – drums

References 

The Posies albums
2000 live albums